The 2014 Bucharest Trophy was the first edition of the Bucharest Trophy held in Bucharest, Romania from 21 to 24 August as a pre-season international women's team handball tournament for clubs. The most recent finalists of the EHF Champions League edition (ŽRK Budućnost) appeared in the tournament, along with the hosts (CSM Bucharest) and others. The most recent winners of the EHF Cup Winners' Cup edition (Viborg HK) have been also invited but withdrew before making a debut due to season's fixtures.

The whole tournament was aired on Sport.ro the channel and Dolce Sport 2.

CSM Bucharest won the title by defeating Budućnost Podgorica in the final.

Participants
  CSM Bucharest (hosts)
  ŽRK Budućnost
  Rostov-Don
  HC Astrakhanochka 
  SG BBM Bietigheim
  Muratpaşa Bld. SK

Results

Group stage

Group A

Group B

Knockout stages

5th place game

3rd place game

Final

Awards

Team of the Tournament
Goalkeeper: 
Left wing: 
Left back: 
Playmaker: 
Pivot: 
Right back: 
Right wing:

Special awards
Top Scorer:  
Most Valuable Player:

References

External links 

Bucharest Trophy
2014 in handball
2014 in Romanian sport
Sport in Bucharest
Bucharest Trophy